Aaron J. Gilbert (born 1979), also known as "AJ", is an American visual artist. He is known for creating symbolically and psychologically charged narrative paintings. He lives and works in Brooklyn.

Biography 
Gilbert was born in 1979 and raised in Altoona, Pennsylvania. He claims to be Cuban American. Though, neither of his parents are racially or ethnically Cuban. 

Gilbert attended Pennsylvania State University and in 2000 received an Associate of Science in mechanical engineering technology. He returned to school at Rhode Island School of Design (RISD) and in 2005 received a Bachelor of Fine Arts degree in Painting. In 2008, he received his Master of Fine Arts degree from Yale University in Painting. Prior to his full time career as an artist, he worked in CAD and as an Engineering Technician in the biomedical industry.

He was previously married to photographer Deana Lawson and together they have two children. Lawson and Gilbert's work is mutually influential, and much of Gilbert's artwork depicts Lawson and their children. His paintings reflect his own claimed ethnic background, as well as more a traditional Western approach to the medium. The paintings feature his bright and moody palette, and the staged but self-aware subjects.

In 2010, Gilbert was awarded the Rosenthal Family Foundation Award for Painting. He is a 2015 Louis Comfort Tiffany Award recipient, and has been awarded by the American Academy of Arts and Letters as the 2010 “Young American Painter of Distinction.” His work is currently in the permanent collection of the Brooklyn Museum of Art, the Whitney Museum, and the Studio Museum in Harlem. Residencies include a 2013 Fountainhead Residency, a 2012 Yaddo residency, a 2008 LMCC Workspace Residency as well as the 2008 Affiliate Fellowship of the American Academy in Rome. 

He has exhibited his work at PPOW New York (2021), Deitch Projects New York (2008), among others. In the fall of 2020, he had a two-person show with Martin Wong at PPOW New York which was reviewed in The New York Times and Art in America.

Exhibitions 

 2008 – Conceptual Figures, Deitch Projects, New York City, New York
 2008–2009 – The New Akademiks, Galerie Schuster, Berlin, Germany
 2009 – The Open, Deitch Studios Long Island City, Long Island City, New York
 2012 – Lessico Famigliare (Family Talk), FUTURA Center for Contemporary Art, Prague, Czech Republic
 2013 – Exposure, Spinello Projects, EXPO Chicago, Navy Pier, Chicago, Illinois
 2013 – Bent In, Primetime Gallery, Brooklyn, New York
 2014 – Selfies & Friends: Contemporary Portraiture, Cade Tompkins Projects, Providence, Rhode Island
2014 – Aaron Gilbert: Possessed, Mottahedan Projects, Dubai, UAE
2016 – "BRIC Biennial: Volume 2 – Bed Stuy/Crown Heights Edition", BRIC, Brooklyn, New York
2019 – Solo Booth with Lulu, Mexico City, NADA, Miami
2019 – Psychic Novellas, Lyles & King, New York City, New York
2021 – 1981–2001, Martin Wong / Aaron Gilbert, P·P·O·W, New York
2021 – Chris Sharp Gallery, Los Angeles, California

Awards 
2010 – Rosenthal Family Foundation Award for Painting
 2015 – Louis Comfort Tiffany Foundation Biennial Award

See also 

 Arturo Rodríguez 
 List of Cuban artists

References

External links 
 
 Some examples of Aaron Gilbert's work

1979 births
American contemporary artists
Penn State College of Engineering alumni
Rhode Island School of Design alumni
Yale University alumni
People from Altoona, Pennsylvania
Artists from Brooklyn
American people of Cuban descent
Place of birth missing (living people)
Living people